Miss Pittsburgh is a historic Waco 9 airplane, powered by a Curtiss OX-5 engine, known for making the first airmail flight from Pittsburgh, Pennsylvania to Cleveland, Ohio on 21 April 1927. Miss Pittsburgh was rediscovered and restored by OX 5 Aviation Pioneers, and is now displayed at the Pittsburgh International Airport Landside Terminal.

Design and performance
Miss Pittsburgh was a Waco 9, built by the Advance Aircraft Company, latterly known as Waco, powered by a Curtiss OX-5 engine. Miss Pittsburgh's fuselage was built from metal tubing covered with cotton cloth and the wings were made of spruce.

History
Miss Pittsburghs first owner was Clifford A. Ball, formerly an auto-mobile dealer who acquired several aircraft as compensation for unpaid storage charges at the Bettis Field, an airport near McKeesport, in which he had a controlling interest. The first airmail flight took off at around noon, 21 April 1927, on a  route from Pittsburgh, Pennsylvania to Cleveland, Ohio. The US Post Office Department awarded Ball Contract Air Mail No. 11 for this route, and he expanded Skyline Transportation Company by buying two more Waco 9s (Miss Youngstown and Miss McKeesport). Skyline Transportation Company acquired more aircraft, was renamed to Cliff Ball Mail Line and was later renamed Pennsylvania Airlines, Pennsylvania Central Airline, Capital Airlines and finally became a part of United Airlines.

As the Waco 9s became obsolete, Miss Pittsburgh found its way to Florida, where the airplane was used for advertising in the 1960s, eventually becoming derelict in New York. In 1993, the OX 5 Pioneers located the aircraft at the Rhinebeck New York Aerodrome. With the support of the Pittsburgh Institute of Aeronautics the group raised money to have the airplane returned to Pittsburgh and after renovation it was displayed at the Pittsburgh International Airport Landside Terminal.

Specifications (Waco 9 with Curtiss OX-5 engine)

Notesa'''  To be clear, Miss Pittsburgh'' was the first airplane to deliver airmail in the Pittsburgh and Cleveland region, but not the first in the world, nor even the first in the United States.

References

External links 

 Vintage photo of Miss Pittsburgh
 Greg Latshaw, Pilot led effort to restore 'Miss Pittsburgh', Pittsburgh Tribune-Review, Thursday, July 6, 2006

History of aviation
History of Pennsylvania
1920s United States mailplanes
Pittsburgh International Airport